Freedom Square is the main square in Sukhumi, Abkhazia. It is used for public events. The parliament of Abkhazia is located on the square.

History 
In the 1920s, it was landscaped and was named Liberty Square. During the Soviet period, the area was named after Vladimir Lenin, and a monument to Lenin stood on the pedestal near the Government House.  In 1985 a government building was built on the square which housed the Council of Ministers of Soviet Abkhazia. It was heavily damaged during the War in Abkhazia (1992–1993).

The following is a list of architectural monuments on the square:
 The ruined building of the Council of Ministers of Abkhazia
 Monument to Vladislav Ardzinba

References 

Sukhumi
National squares